Onley Hill is a bare rock hill, 840 m, standing 1 nautical mile (1.9 km) south of Mount Henderson in the northeast part of the Framnes Mountains, Mac. Robertson Land. Mapped by Norwegian cartographers from air photos taken by the Lars Christensen Expedition, 1936–37, and named Sorkollen (the south knoll). Renamed by Antarctic Names Committee of Australia (ANCA) for L. Onley, weather observer at Mawson Station in 1959.

Hills of Mac. Robertson Land